Dana Ivgy (born April 3, 1982) is an Israeli actress and the daughter of actor Moshe Ivgy.

Career
As a child, Ivgy appeared in several television and film productions. Since graduating from acting school she has appeared in several critically acclaimed films.

In 2002 she garnered the attention of the Israeli Film Academy when she was nominated for the Best Supporting Actress award for her portrayals of Sarit in the sports drama Beitar Provence. She also received the nomination for her role of Tikva Ida in the drama, The Barbecue People based around a picnic celebrating Israeli Independence day. She also appeared in the critically acclaimed film, Broken Wings.

She received considerable acclaim as the protagonist in Keren Yedaya's 2004 picture, Or (My Treasure) a drama about a teenager (Ivgy) and her prostitute mother (played by Ronit Elkabetz). She was awarded prizes by international film festivals and won the Best Actress award by the Israeli Film Academy.

In 2006 she appeared in Aviva, My Love, which won the Israeli Film Academy's award for Best Film. A year later she appeared in Amos Gitai's French-Israeli film, Disengagement about a mother's search for the child she abandoned, amidst the disengagement on the IDF in Gaza.

In 2009 she reunited with Yedaya and Elkabetz for Jaffa, a Romeo & Juliet-inspired drama about an Israeli Jewish girl and an Israeli Arab boy who have conceived a baby and conspire to marry each other, before tragedy interrupts their plans. Her depiction of the pregnant protagonist led to another Best Actress nomination from the Israeli Film Academy. She shared this nomination with her work in Haiu Leilot alongside her father, Moshe Ivgy.

Ivgy has also established Tziporela, a theatre company and is currently writing and directing a short film.

Filmography

References

External links

1982 births
Living people
Israeli film actresses
Israeli television actresses
Israeli Sephardi Jews
Israeli people of Moroccan-Jewish descent
Israeli Mizrahi Jews
People from Tel Aviv
21st-century Israeli actresses